Turkey Mountain may refer to:
 Turkey Mountain (Georgia)
 Turkey Mountain (New York)
  Turkey Mountain (Oklahoma)
The  Turkey Mountain petroglyphs
 Turkey Mountains (New Mexico)